Armuchee is an unincorporated community in both Floyd County and Chattooga County, Georgia, United States. Armuchee has a post office with ZIP code 30105. The Richard B. Russell Airport is in Armuchee. On November 1, 2020 Donald Trump the 45th President of the United States hosted a trump rally at the airport. This was the only visit to Floyd County, Georgia by a sitting president.

History
A post office called Armuchee has been in operation since 1837. The community takes its name from nearby Armuchee Creek.

References

Unincorporated communities in Floyd County, Georgia
Unincorporated communities in Georgia (U.S. state)